Rowland Main Street Historic District is a national historic district located at Rowland, Robeson County, North Carolina. The district encompasses 35 contributing buildings and 1 contributing structure in the central business district of Rowland.  It includes buildings built between about 1891 to 1954 in a variety of popular architectural styles including Bungalow / American Craftsman.  Notable buildings include the S.L. Adams Grocery and General Store (1891), Hedgepath and Chitty Clothing and Shoe Store (1905), Kheiralla Brothers Store (c. 1920), Rowland Drug Company (1902), Merchants and Farmers Bank (1911), Former Fire Station (c. 1948), and Rolling Milling Company (c. 1940).  Six buildings have stamped metal fronts manufactured from galvanized sheet iron by the Chattanooga Roofing and Foundry Company.

It was added to the National Register of Historic Places in 2005.

References

Historic districts on the National Register of Historic Places in North Carolina
Buildings and structures in Robeson County, North Carolina
National Register of Historic Places in Robeson County, North Carolina